Leichosila is a genus of moths in the subfamily Arctiinae. The genus was described by Christian Schmidt in 2009.

Species
 Leichosila talamanca Schmidt, 2009
 Leichosila wagneri Schmidt, 2009

References

Arctiini
Moth genera